First Lady of Bulgaria is an unofficial honorific applied to the wife of the president of Bulgaria. Officially, her term as first lady is concurrent with her husband's term in office. The first lady often accompanies the head of state during state visits and official functions. The title of First Lady was first used in Bulgaria in the early 1990s, following the example of the United States.

The current first lady is Desislava Radeva, the wife of the 5th president of Bulgaria, Rumen Radev. At present, have been five first ladies of the Republic of Bulgaria, including Radeva.

Spouses of the general secretary of the Bulgarian Communist Party
 Roza Yulievna – (27 December 1948 – 2 July 1949)
 Elena Dimitrova – (15 July 1949 – 26 January 1954)
 Mara Maleeva-Zhivkova – (4 March 1954 – 23 October 1971)
 Position Vacant – (23 October 1971 – 10 November 1989)
 Galya Mladenova (10 November 1989 – 2 February 1990)

List of first ladies
 Maria Zheleva – (1 August 1990 – 22 January 1997)
 Antonina Stoyanova – (22 January 1997 – 22 January 2002)
 Zorka Parvanova – (22 January 2002 – 22 January 2012)
 Yuliyana Plevnelieva – (22 January 2012 – 22 January 2017)
 Desislava Radeva – (22 January 2017 – Present)

References 

 
Bulgaria